"Nicky Jam: Bzrp Music Sessions, Vol. 41" is a song by Argentine record producer Bizarrap and American singer and rapper Nicky Jam. It was released on June 30, 2021, through Dale Play Records, the music video was released on Bizarrap's YouTube channel. This is the second Bzrp Music Sessions to feature an artist of Puerto Rican descent and was released two weeks after "Eladio Carrión: Bzrp Music Sessions, Vol. 40" with Eladio Carrión, who was the first Puerto Rican artist to record with Bizarrap. This song is Music Sessions number 41. The song reached number 1 on the Billboard Argentina Hot 100 chart and has more than 30 million streams on Spotify within weeks of its release.

Background
The Bzrp Music Sessions had been leaked three days before its release when Bizarrap was at the airport and a fan recorded a video behind his back showing Bizarrap seeing a photo of him and Nicky Jam letting it be known that the next Bzrp Music Sessions would be from said artist. On June 29, 2021, when the promotion of the last Bzrp Music Sessions with the Puerto Rican rapper Eladio Carrión had not finished, Bizarrap announced the Bzrp Music Sessions with Nicky Jam which was published the following day.

Composition and lyric
The lyrics of the song were written by Nicky Jam and Reggi "El Auténtico", in the song it refers to the deceased former Argentine footballer Diego Maradona and to the 1986 FIFA World Cup in Mexico since in that tournament Maradona became champion with the Argentina national football team.

Music video
The music video for the song was published on the same day as the single's release on Bizarrap's YouTube channel and reached number 1 in trends in several countries where Bizarrap had never reached like the United States. In just one day, the song reached 12 million views on YouTube and became the Latin song that got a million likes in less than 24 hours, a place occupied by the song "Yonaguni" by Bad Bunny. Currently the music video has more than 90 million views on YouTube.

Personnel
Credits adapted from Tidal.

 Nicky Jam – vocals
 Bizarrap – producer
 Reggi "El Auténtico" – songwriter
 Evlay – mixing
 Javier Fracchia – mastering
 Salvi Díaz – videographer
 Agustín Sartori – video vfx

Charts

Certifications

References

2021 songs
2021 singles
Bizarrap songs
Nicky Jam songs
Songs written by Nicky Jam
Song recordings produced by Bizarrap
Argentina Hot 100 number-one singles
Reggaeton songs
Spanglish songs